Psammodromus algirus, known commonly as the Algerian psammodromus, the Algerian sand racer, and the large psammodromus, is a species of lizard in the family Lacertidae. The species is endemic to western Europe and northwestern Africa.

Geographic range
Psammodromus algirus is found in Algeria, France, Gibraltar, Italy, Morocco, Portugal, Spain, and Tunisia.

Habitat
The natural habitats of P. algirus are temperate forests, Mediterranean-type shrubby vegetation, sandy shores, arable land, pastureland, plantations, and rural gardens. (Miras et al. 2005)

Diet
Psammodromus algirus mainly feeds on terrestrial arthropods, specifically Orthoptera, Formicidae, Coleoptera, Hemiptera, and Araneae.

Conservation status
P. algirus is threatened by habitat loss. (Miras et al. 2005)

Description
P. algirus commonly reaches a length of about 10 to 15 cm.

See also
List of reptiles of Italy
List of Reptiles of Portugal
Psammodromus

References

Further reading
Arnold EN, Burton JA (1978). A Field Guide to Reptiles and Amphibians of Britain and Europe. London: Collins. 272 pp. + Plates 1-40. . (Psammodromus algirus, pp. 120–121 + Plate 17, figure 2 + Map 61).
Boulenger GA (1887). Catalogue of the Lizards in the British Museum (Natural History). Second Edition. Volume III. Lacertidæ ... London: Trustees of the British Museum. (Taylor and Francis, printers). xii + 575 pp. + Plates I-XL. (Psammodromus algirus, new combination, p. 50).
Linnaeus C (1758). Systema naturæ per regna tria naturæ, secundum classes, ordines, genera, species, cum characteribus, differentiis, synonymis, locis. Tomus I. Editio Decima, Reformata. Stockholm: L. Salvius. 824 pp. (Lacerta algira, new species, p. 203). (in Latin).

External links
Miras JAM, Cheylan M, Nouira MS, Joger U, Sá-Sousa P, Pérez-Mellado V (2005).  Psammodromus algirus. 2006 IUCN Red List of Threatened Species.   Downloaded on 28 July 2007.

Psammodromus
Reptiles described in 1758
Taxa named by Carl Linnaeus
Taxonomy articles created by Polbot